Zebinella striosa is a species of minute sea snail, a marine gastropod mollusk or micromollusk in the family Rissoinidae.

Distribution
This species  occurs in the Gulf of Mexico, the Caribbean Sea and the Lesser Antilles; in the Atlantic Ocean off Northern Brazil.

Description 
The maximum recorded shell length is 8 mm.

Habitat 
Minimum recorded depth is 0 m. Maximum recorded depth is 1 m.

References

 Adams, C.B. (1845) Specierum novarum conchyliorum, in Jamaica repertorum, synopsis. Proceedings of the Boston Society of Natural History, 2, 1–17 page(s): 6
 Rosenberg, G., F. Moretzsohn, and E. F. García. 2009. Gastropoda (Mollusca) of the Gulf of Mexico, Pp. 579–699 in Felder, D.L. and D.K. Camp (eds.), Gulf of Mexico–Origins, Waters, and Biota. Biodiversity. Texas A&M Press, College Station, Texas

Rissoinidae
Gastropods described in 1850